Varazdeh-e Sofla (also Romanized as Varāzdeh-e Soflá; also known as Varāzdeh-ye Pā’īn) is a village in Mianrud Rural District, Chamestan District, Nur County, Mazandaran Province, Iran. At the 2006 census, its population was 546, in 139 families.

References 

Populated places in Nur County